NK Svoboda may refer to:

NK Svoboda Ljubljana
NK Svoboda Kisovec
NK Svoboda Brežice, old name of NK Brežice 1919

See also
FK Sloboda (disambiguation)